Choreutis gratiosa is a species of moth of the family Choreutidae. It is found in the Seychelles and South Africa.

References

Choreutis
Moths of Africa
Fauna of Seychelles
Moths described in 1911